Chatteris railway station was a station in Chatteris, Cambridgeshire on the line between St Ives and March. For much of its history it was run by the Great Eastern Railway. It closed to passengers on 6 March 1967 in the wake of the Beeching Report. The station was demolished in the early 1970s and the station site/ trackbed used for the new alignment of the A141 road.

External links
 Chatteris station on navigable 1946 O. S. map

Former Great Northern and Great Eastern Joint Railway stations
Disused railway stations in Cambridgeshire
Railway stations in Great Britain opened in 1848
Railway stations in Great Britain closed in 1967
Beeching closures in England
Chatteris